Ward 1 is a ward of Sa Đéc in Đồng Tháp Province, Vietnam.

References

Populated places in Đồng Tháp province